Clinton L. Jenkins is an American politician. A Democrat, he is a member of the Virginia House of Delegates, representing the 76th district since 2020.

Biography
A native of the district, Jenkins was raised in Suffolk, Virginia. He is an army veteran, manages a real estate company, and is the chairman of the Democratic party for Virginia's 3rd congressional district.

Political career

2019
In the 2019 Virginia House of Delegates election, Jenkins challenged incumbent Republican Chris Jones, a pharmacist and chairman of the House Appropriations committee who had represented the district since 1998. Redistricting in 2019 shifted the demographics of the district, causing a Democratic majority. Both candidates ran unopposed in their primaries. Jenkins won with 56.3% of the vote.

2020
Jenkins was an elector for Joe Biden and Kamala Harris in Virginia’s 2020 election for U.S. president.

2021
In the 2021 Virginia House of Delegates election, Jenkins won reelection, defeating Republican Michael Dillender and Independent Craig Warren with 53.3% of the vote.

2023
In 2022, Jenkins announced a run for the newly redrawn 17th district in the 2023 Virginia Senate election.

References

Living people
Democratic Party members of the Virginia House of Delegates
21st-century American politicians
Military personnel from Virginia
Politicians from Suffolk, Virginia
American real estate businesspeople
Year of birth missing (living people)
2020 United States presidential electors